Madhubala (born Mumtaz Jehan Begum Dehlavi; 14 February 1933 – 23 February 1969) was an Indian actress and producer who worked in Hindi-language films. She ranked as one of the highest-paid entertainers in India in the post-independence era, that coincided with the rise of Indian cinema on global levels. In a career spanning more than 20 years, Madhubala was predominantly active for only a decade but had appeared in over 60 films by the time of her death in 1969.

Born and raised in Delhi, Madhubala relocated to Bombay with her family when she was 8 years old and shortly after appeared in minor roles in a number of films. She soon progressed to leading roles in the late 1940s, and earned success with the dramas Neel Kamal (1947) and Amar (1954), the horror film Mahal (1949), and the romantic films Badal (1951) and Tarana (1951). Following a brief setback, Madhubala rose to international prominence with her roles in the comedies Mr. & Mrs. '55 (1955), Chalti Ka Naam Gaadi (1958) and Half Ticket (1962), the crime films Howrah Bridge and Kala Pani (both 1958), and the musical Barsaat Ki Raat (1960).

Madhubala's portrayal of Anarkali in the historical epic drama Mughal-e-Azam (1960)the highest-grossing film in India at that point of timeearned her widespread critical acclaim and her only nomination for the Filmfare Award for Best Actress; her performance has since been described by critics as one of the finest in Indian cinematic history.  She worked sporadically in film in the 1960s, making her final appearance in the drama Sharabi (1964). Additionally, she produced three films under her production house Madhubala Private Ltd., which was co-founded by her in 1953.

Despite maintaining strong privacy, Madhubala earned significant media coverage for performing actively in charity, and for her relationships with actor Dilip Kumar, which lasted seven years, and with actor-singer Kishore Kumar, whom she eventually married in 1960. From the beginning of her thirties, she suffered from recurring bouts of breathlessness and hemoptysis caused by a ventricular septal defect, ultimately leading to her death in 1969.

Childhood and early career

Madhubala was born as Mumtaz Jehan Begum Dehlavi in Delhi, British India, on 14 February 1933. She was the fifth of eleven children of Ataullah Khan and Aayesha Begum. At least four of Madhubala's siblings died as infants; her sisters who survived until adulthood were Kaneez Fatima (b. 1925), Altaf (b. 1930), Chanchal (b. 1934) and Zahida (b. 1949). Khan, who belonged to the Yusufzai tribe of Pashtuns from Peshawar valley, was an employee in Imperial Tobacco Company. Unknown to her family members, Madhubala was born with a ventricular septal defect, a congenital heart disorder which had no treatment at the time.

Madhubala spent most of her childhood in Delhi and grew up without any kind of health issues. Owing to the orthodox ideas of their Muslim father, neither Madhubala nor any of her sisters except Zahida attended school. Madhubala nevertheless learnt Urdu, Hindi as well as her native language, Pashto, under her father's guidance. An avid movie viewer since the beginning, she used to perform her favourite scenes in front of her mother and spend her time dancing and imitating film characters to entertain herself. In spite of her conservative upbringing, she aimed to become a film actorwhich her father strictly disapproved of.

Khan's decision changed in 1940 after he got fired from the employee company for misbehaving with a senior officer. Madhubala's mother feared ostracism if they allowed their young daughter to work in the entertainment industry, but Khan remained adamant. Soon Madhubala was employed at the All India Radio station to sing compositions of Khurshid Anwar. The seven-year-old continued working there for months, and became acquainted with Rai Bahadur Chunnilal, the general manager of the studio Bombay Talkies, situated in Bombay. Chunnilal took an immediate liking towards Madhubala, eventually suggesting Khan to visit Bombay for better employment opportunities.

Acting career

Early work and switch to adult roles (1942–1947)

In the summer of 1941, Khan, Madhubala and other family members relocated to Bombay and settled down in a cowshed present in the Malad suburbs of Bombay. Following an approval from the studio executives, Chunnilal signed Madhubala to a juvenile role in Bombay Talkies' production, Basant (1942), at a salary of 150. Released in July 1942, Basant became a major success commercially, but although Madhubala's work garnered appreciation, the studio dropped her contract as it did not require a child actor at that time. Disappointed, Khan had to once again return his family to Delhi. He subsequently found low-paid temporary jobs in the city, but continued to struggle financially.

In 1944, Bombay Talkies' head and former actress Devika Rani sent for Khan to summon Madhubala for role in Jwar Bhata (1944). Madhubala did not get the film but Khan now decided to settle permanently in Bombay seeing a prospect in films. The family again returned to their temporary residence in Malad and Khan and Madhubala began paying frequent visits to film studios throughout the city in search of work. Madhubala was soon signed to a three-year contract with Chandulal Shah's studio Ranjit Movietone, on a monthly payment of 300. Her income led to Khan shifting the family to a neighbouring rented house in Malad.

In April 1944, the rented house was destroyed in a dock explosion; Madhubala and her family survived only because they had gone to a local theatre. After shifting into her friend's house, Madhubala continued her film career, playing minor roles in five of Ranjit's films: Mumtaz Mahal (1944), Dhanna Bhagat (1945), Rajputani (1946), Phoolwari (1946) and Pujari (1946); she was credited as "Baby Mumtaz" in all of them. She faced numerous problems in these years; during the shoot of Phoolwari in 1945, Madhubala vomited blood, which forewarned her illness that was slowly taking root. In 1946, she had to borrow money from a film producer for the treatment of her pregnant mother. Eager to establish a foothold in the industry, in November 1946, Madhubala began shooting for two of Mohan Sinha's directorial ventures, Chittor Vijay and Mere Bhagwaan, which were supposed to be her introduction to the silver-screen in adult roles.

Madhubala's first project in a lead role was Sohrab Modi's Daulat, but it was shelved indefinitely (and would not be revived until the next year). Her debut as a leading lady came in Kidar Sharma's drama Neel Kamal, in which she starred opposite debutante Raj Kapoor and Begum Para. She was offered the film after Sharma's first choice, actress Kamla Chatterjee, died. Released in March 1947, Neel Kamal was popular with audience and garnered wide public recognition for Madhubala. She then reteamed with Kapoor in Chittor Vijay and Dil Ki Rani, both of which were released in 1947, and in Amar Prem, which came out the following year. These films were unsuccessful ventures that failed to propel her career ahead. During this period, she had to charge a relatively lesser amount than her usual fee to attract more offers. To secure her family financially, Madhubala quickly signed 24 films. Impressed by her work in Neel Kamal, in which Madhubala was credited as "Mumtaz", Devika Rani suggested her to take "Madhubala" as her professional name.

Rise to prominence and fluctuations (1948–1957)
Madhubala found her first critical and commercial success in the drama Lal Dupatta, which The Indian Express mentioned as a breakthrough for her. Baburao Patel described the film as "the first milestone of her maturity in screen acting." She received further positive reviews for her supporting parts in Parai Aag (1948), Paras and Singaar (both 1949). In 1949, Madhubala played a femme fatale in Kamal Amrohi's Mahalthe first horror film of Indian cinema. Several actresses including Suraiya were considered for the role but Amrohi insisted on casting Madhubala. Her character was that of Kamini, a servant girl in an ancient mansion, whose pretensions of an apparition lead to disastrous consequences. The film was produced on a modest budget due to financial constraints, with trade analysts predicting it to be a failure owing to its unconventional subject. Mahal was released in October 1949 and proved to be an immensely popular film among audience. In Beyond the Boundaries of Bollywood, Rachel Dwyer noted that Madhubala's ignorance among audience added to the mysterious nature of her character. The film, which would be Madhubala's first of many collaborations with actor and brother-in-law Ashok Kumar, emerged as the third biggest box-office success of the year, resulting in her signing a string of starring roles opposite the leading actors of the time.

Following another box office hit in Dulari (1949), Madhubala played Ajit's love interest in K. Amarnath's social drama Beqasoor (1950). The feature received positive reviews and ranked among the year's top-grossing Bollywood productions. Also in 1950, she appeared in the comedy-drama Hanste Aansoo, which became the first Indian film to be awarded an adult's certification. The following year, Madhubala starred in the Amiya Chakravarty-directed action film Badal (1951), a remake of The Adventures of Robin Hood. Her portrayal of a princess who ignorantly falls in love with Prem Nath's character received mixed reviews; a critic praised her looks but advised her to "learn to speak her dialogue slowly, distinctly and effectively instead of rattling through her lines in a monotone." She subsequently played the titular part in M. Sadiq's romance Saiyan, which Roger Yue of The Singapore Free Press commented was played "to perfection". Both Badal and Saiyan proved to be major box-office successes. Madhubala then collaborated with actor Dilip Kumar twice in a row, on the 1951 comedy Tarana and the 1952 drama Sangdil. These films also performed well financially, popularizing the on and offscreen couple among wide audience. Baburao Patel's filmindia review of Tarana read, "Incidentally, Madhubala gives the best performance of her screen career in this picture. She seems to have discovered her soul at last in Dilip Kumar's company."

The period during the mid-1950s saw a drop in Madhubala's success, as most of her releases failed commercially, leading her to be labelled "box office poison". Madhubala was cast in the costume drama Shahehshah (1953) before Kamini Kaushal replaced her. In April 1953, Madhubala founded a production company called Madhubala Private Ltd. The following year, while shooting in Madras for S. S. Vasan's Bahut Din Huwe (1954), she suffered a major health setback due to her heart disease. She returned to Bombay after completing the film and took a short-term medical leave from work, which led to her replacement (by Nimmi) in Uran Khatola (1955). Madhubala later starred in another film of 1954Mehboob Khan's Amar, portraying a social worker involved in a love triangle along with Dilip Kumar and Nimmi. Madhubala improvised a scene from the film; it was unsuccessful at the box-office. Nevertheless, Rachit Gupta of Filmfare stated that Madhubala overshadowed her co-stars and "floored her role with a nuanced performance." Writing for Rediff.com in 2002, Dinesh Raheja described Amar as "arguably Madhubala's first truly mature performance" and particularly noted a dramatic scene featuring her with Dilip. Madhubala's next release was her own production venture, Naata (1955), in which she co-starred with her real-life sister Chanchal. The film met with a tepid response and lost a lot of money, leading Madhubala to sell her bungalow Kismet to compensate.

Undeterred by recent failures, Madhubala made a comeback in 1955 with Guru Dutt's comedy Mr. & Mrs. '55, which emerged as one of the year's highest-grossing films in India and her biggest success at that point of time. The film saw Madhubala playing Anita Verma, a naive heiress who is forced into a sham marriage with Dutt's character by her spinster aunt (Lalita Pawar). Harneet Singh of The Indian Express called Mr. & Mrs. '55 "a great ride" and acknowledged Madhubala's "impish charm and breezy comic timing" as one of its prime assests. A conflict broke out between Madhubala–Khan and director B. R. Chopra in mid-1956 over the location shoot of Naya Daur, in which Madhubala was cast to play the female protagonist. Citing her as uncooperative and unprofessional, Chopra replaced Madhubala with Vyjayanthimala and further sued the former for 30 thousand in damages. The lawsuit continued for about eight months amidst public scrutiny before Chopra withdrew it after Naya Daur got released.

During the years 1956–57, Madhubala slightly reduced her workload due to the lawsuit and health issues. She and Nargis were approached by Guru Dutt to play either of the two female leads (an unfaithful girlfriend or a hooker with a heart of gold) in his production, Pyaasa (1957). However, unable to choose between the two leading roles, the actresses passed over the film to the newcomers Mala Sinha and Waheeda Rehman. Madhubala appeared in two period films in 1956, Raj Hath and Shirin Farhad, both critical and commercial successes. The following year, she portrayed a runaway heiress in Om Prakash's Gateway of India (1957), which critic Deepa Gahlot believed to be one of the finest performances of her career. Madhubala then starred in the drama Ek Saal (1957), which followed a terminally-ill ingenue (Madhubala) who falls in love with Ashok Kumar's character. The film proved popular with audience and became as a box office hit, thereby re-establishing Madhubala's stardom.

Resurgence, acclaim and final works (1958–1964)

Madhubala began the year 1958 with Raj Khosla's Kala Pani, in which she co-starred with Dev Anand and Nalini Jaywant, playing an intrepid journalist investigating a 15-year-old murder. She was then cast as Edna opposite Ashok Kumar in Howrah Bridge (1958), her first collaboration with director Shakti Samanta. Madhubala waived her fees to play the role of an Anglo-Indian cabaret dancer, which marked a departure from her previous portrayals of sophisticated characters. Both Howrah Bridge and Kala Pani begot positive reviews for her and became two of the year's top-grossing films. She followed this success with the box office hit Phagun (1958). In her final release of 1958, Madhubala portrayed a wealthy city woman involved in a love affair with Kishore Kumar in Satyen Bose's comedy Chalti Ka Naam Gaadione of the biggest money-making pictures of the 1950s. Dinesh Raheja of Rediff.com referred to the film as the "fifties jest-setter", adding that Madhubala "exudes oodles of charisma and her giggles are infectious." Writing for the same portral in 2012, columnist Rinki Roy mentioned Madhubala's character in Chalti Ka Naam Gaadi as "a top favourite": "Her breezy performance stands out as that rare example of an independent, urban woman. [...] For me, Madhubala is the face of the original celluloid diva."

Her second collaboration with Samanta, Insan Jaag Utha (1959), was a social drama film in which the protagonists work on the construction of a dam. A modest success, its critical reception has improved over years. Rachit Gupta of Filmfare and Roktim Rajpal of Deccan Herald have cited Madhubala's performance as Gauri, a village belle, as one of her finest works. Further in 1959, she received praise for playing dual roles in Kal Hamara Hai, also starring Bharat Bhushan. Khatija Akbar, the author of Madhubala: Her Life, Her Films (1997), called her turn as "a polished performance, particularly in the role of the misguided 'other' sister." The commercial success of Do Ustad (1959), which saw her reuniting with Raj Kapoor, was followed by the second film of Madhubala Private Ltd.—the comedy Mehlon Ke Khwab (1960). It fared poorly at the box office.

Journalist Dinesh Raheja described K. Asif's Mughal-e-Azam (1960) as the "crowning glory" of Madhubala's career. Co-starring Dilip Kumar and Prithviraj Kapoor, the film revolves on a 16th-century court dancer, Anarkali (Madhubala), and her affair with the Mughal prince Salim (Kumar). Since the mid-1940s, Asif had rejected numerous actresses for the part of Anarkali. Madhubala joined the cast in 1952 and received an advance payment of Rs. 1 lakhthe highest for any actor or actress until then. The filming period proved to be taxing. Her relationship with Kumar ended amidst shooting and there were reports of animosity between the actors. Madhubala was also troubled by the night schedules and complicated dance sequences, which she had been medically asked to avoid. She fell under the weight of iron chains, extinguished candles with her palm, starved herself for days to depict anguishness in particular scenes and had continuous water flung at her face and whole body painted. The principal photography for Mughal-e-Azam was finished in May 1959 and left her exhausted, both physically and mentally, to a point that she began considering a retirement.

Mughal-e-Azam was first of Madhubala's two films in colour; it had four reels shot in Technicolor. The film had the widest release of any Indian film up to that time, and patrons often queued all day for tickets. Released on 5 August 1960, it broke box office records in India and became the highest-grossing Indian film of all time, a distinction it would hold for 15 years. At the 1961 National Film Awards, Mughal-e-Azam won the National Film Award for Best Feature Film in Hindi and led the 8th Filmfare Awards ceremony with 11 nominations, including Best Actress for Madhubala. A reviewer for The Indian Express commented, "Scene after scene bears testimony to the outstanding gifts of Madhubala as a natural actress [...] The way she presents Anarkali's changing moods as she passes through the lightning vicissitudes in her life is superb."

The success of Mughal-e-Azam resulted in a string of offers in major roles, but Madhubala had to refuse them owing to her heart condition. She further withdrew from some productions that were already underway, including Bombai Ka Babu, Naughty Boy, Jahan Ara, Yeh Basti Ye Log, Suhana Geet and an untitled film with Kishore Sahu. She did, however, had few more releases, which were completed either by body doubles or by Madhubala herself. In late 1960, Madhubala was seen in Shakti Samanta's crime film Jaali Note, based on the theme of counterfeit money; it was successful financially. However, Karan Bali of Upperstall.com mentioned her role as "sketchy" and found the romance between her and Dev Anand's characters unconvincing. Madhubala's starring role in the musical Barsaat Ki Raat (1960) was better received. The feature was the year's second-highest-grossing film, trailing only Mughal-e-Azam. A critic for The Indian Express found her "enchanting", while Venkat Parsa of The Siasat Daily noted the rebellious nature of her character, Shabnam, who elopes with her lover (played by Bharat Bhushan) after her parents object to the relationship.

The back-to-back blockbuster successes of Mughal-e-Azam and Barsaat Ki Raat established Madhubala as the most successful leading lady of 1960. She subsequently discontinued her career and only preferred starring as love interests in a few films, including the comedies Jhumroo (1961), Boy Friend (1961) and Half Ticket (1962), and the dramas Passport (1961) and Sharabi (1964). Her all three 1961 releases were among the top-grossing productions of the year. Half Ticket, her last collaboration with husband Kishore Kumar was a critical and commercial success as well. Sukanya Verma called the film one of her most favourite comedies of all time, praising the "palpably fond chemistry" between Madhubala and Kishore. Also released in 1962 was Madhubala Private Ltd.'s third and last presentation, Pathan, which turned out to be a box office flop. Following a sabbatical of two years, she completed Sharabi in 1964; the film became her final release in her lifetime. Baburao Patel, writing for Mother India, praised Madhubala's performance for "reviv[ing] the old heartache". An editor for Rediff.com called Sharabi a "fitting finale to a luminous career, showing the actress at her most beautiful and her most effective, a heroine destined not to age in any of our eyes."

In 1971, one of Madhubala's incomplete works, Jwala, was released. Co-starring Sunil Dutt and Sohrab Modi, the film was mainly completed with the help of body doubles. It marked Madhubala's final screen role.

Personal life
Born in an orthodox family, Madhubala was deeply religious and practiced Islam since her childhood. After securing her family financially in the late 1940s, she rented a bungalow on Peddar Road in Bombay and named it "Arabian Villa". It became her permanent residence until death. She learnt driving at the age of 12 and by adulthood was an owner of five cars: Buick, Chevrolet, Station wagon, Hillman, and Town & Country (which was owned by only two people in India at that time, Maharaja of Gwalior and Madhubala). As a native speaker of three Hindustani languages, she began learning English in 1950 from former actress Sushila Rani Patel and grew fluent in the language in three months. She also kept eighteen Alsatian dogs as pets in Arabian Villa.

In mid-1950, Madhubala was diagnosed with an incurable ventricular septal defect in her heart during a medical checkup; the diagnosis was not made a public information as it could jeopardize her career.

Philanthropy
She performed actively in charity, which led editor Baburao Patel to call her the "queen of charity". In 1950, she donated 5,000 each to children suffering from polio myelitis and to the Jammu And Kashmir relief fund, and 50,000 for the refugees from East Bengal. Madhubala's donation sparked off a major controversy due to her religious beliefs and received wide coverage in the media at that time. Subsequently, she kept her charity work guarded and donated anonymously. In 1954, it was revealed that Madhubala had been regularly giving monthly bonuses to the lower staff of her studios. She also gifted a camera crane to the Film and Television Institute of India in 1962, which is operational even today.

Friendships
When she was a minor and in Delhi, Madhubala had a close friend named Latif, to whom she left a rose before her family relocated to Bombay. While working as a child artist in the mid-1940s, Madhubala befriended Baby Mahjabeen, another child actor of that time, who later grew up as actress Meena Kumari. Despite their professional rivalry, Madhubala shared a cordial relationship with Kumari as well as other female stars, such as Nargis, Nimmi, Begum Para, Geeta Bali, Nirupa Roy and Nadira. In 1951, following a major conflict with the press, Madhubala established a friendship with journalist B. K. Karanjia, who became one of the few people of his profession to be allowed inside Arabian Villa. Sarla Bhushan, the wife of Bharat Bhushan, with whom Madhubala had a special bond, died of labour complications in 1957, much to her distress. Madhubala was also close to three of her earliest directorsKidar Sharma, Mohan Sinha, and Kamal Amrohiand while there have been rumours regarding her being emotionally involved with them, her younger sister Madhur Bhushan has refuted such claims. On the sets of Mughal-e-Azam (1960), Madhubala often ate lunch with Zulfiqar Ali Bhutto, a Pakistani barrister who later served as the country's Prime Minister. He used to visit the sets especially for Madhubala, and according to Sushila Kumari was Madhubala's one-sided lover.

Relationships and marriage
Madhubala's first relationship was with her Badal co-star Prem Nath, in early 1951. They broke-up under six months due to religious differences. Nath nevertheless remained close to Madhubala and her father Ataullah Khan for the rest of their lives. Also in 1951, Madhubala began a romance with actor Dilip Kumar, whom she had earlier met working on Jwar Bhata (1944). Their affair went on to receive wide media attention throughout the decade. It had a positive impact on Madhubala and her friends have recalled the following few years as the happiest of her life.

As their relationship progressed, Madhubala and Dilip got engaged but could not marry as Khan had some objections. Khan wanted Dilip to act in his production house's films, which the actor refused. Also, Dilip specified to Madhubala that if they were to marry, she will have to sever all ties with her family. She parted ways with him in 1957 amidst the court case over the production of Naya Daur (1957). Dilip testified against her and Khan in court, which left Madhubala devastated. In the meantime, Madhubala was proposed marriage by three of her co-stars: Bharat Bhushan, a widower, Pradeep Kumar and Kishore Kumar, both of whom were already married.

On the sets of Chalti Ka Naam Gaadi (1958), Madhubala rekindled a friendship with Kishore Kumar, her childhood playmate and her friend Ruma Guha Thakurta's ex-husband. Following a two-year-long courtship, Madhubala married Kishore in court on 16 October 1960. The union was kept from the industry and was not announced until the newlyweds held a reception some days later. Moreover, the couple were considered mismatch due to their contrasting personalities.

Health deterioration and final years

Soon after their marriage in 1960, Madhubala and Kishore Kumar traveled to London along with her doctor Rustom Jal Vakil, combining their honeymoon with the specialised treatment of Madhubala's heart disease, which was aggravating rapidly. In London, doctors refused to operate on her, fearing complications, and instead advised Madhubala to avoid any kind of stress and anxiety. She was dissuaded from having any children and given a life expectancy of two years. 
Madhubala and Kishore subsequently returned to Bombay and she shifted to Kishore's home in Bandra. Her health conditions continued declining and she now frequently quarrelled with her husband. Ashok Kumar (Kishore's elder brother) recalled that her sickness turned her into a "bad-tempered" person and she spent most of her time in her father's house. To escape the bitterness of her in-laws due to religious differences, Madhubala later moved into Kishore's newly bought flat at Quarter Deck in Bandra. However, Kishore stayed in the flat only for a short period and then left her alone with a nurse and a driver. Although he was bearing all her medical expenses, Madhubala felt abandoned and returned to her own house in less than two months of her marriage. For the rest of her life, he visited her occasionally, which Madhubala's sister Madhur Bhushan thought was possibly to "detach himself from her so that the final separation wouldn't hurt."
In late June 1966, Madhubala seemed to have partly recovered and decided to return to film again with J. K. Nanda's Chalaak, opposite Raj Kapoor, which was unfinished since she left the industry. Her comeback was welcomed by the media, but Madhubala immediately fainted as the shoot began; the film was thus never completed. She was subsequently hospitalized in the Breach Candy Hospital, where she met her former boyfriend Dilip Kumar and returned home after being discharged. To alleviate her insomnia, Madhubala used hypnotic on Ashok's suggestion, but it further exacerbated her problems.

Madhubala spent her final years bedridden and lost a lot of weight. Her particular fascination was Urdu poetry and she regularly watched her films (particularly Mughal-e-Azam) on a home projector. She grew very reclusive, meeting only Geeta Dutt and Waheeda Rehman from the film industry in those days. She had to undergo exchange transfusion almost every week. Her body began producing excess blood that would spill out of her nose and mouth; Vakil had to thus extract the blood to prevent complications, and an oxygen cylinder had to kept by her side as she often suffered from hypoxia. After the Chalaak incident, Madhubala turned her attention to film direction and began preparing for her directorial debut, titled Farz aur Ishq, in February 1969.

Death
By early 1969, Madhubala's health was in serious and major decline: she had just contracted jaundice and on urinalysis was diagnosed as having hematuria. Madhubala suffered a heart attack in the midnight of 22 February. After struggling for few hours amongst her family members and Kishore, she died at 9:30 a.m. of 23 February, only nine days after turning 36. Madhubala was buried at Juhu Muslim Cemetery in Santacruz, Bombay along with her personal diary. Her tomb was built with marbles and inscriptions include aayats from Quran and verse dedications.

Due to Madhubala's absence from the social scene for almost a decade, her death was perceived as unexpected and found wide coverage in the Indian press. The Indian Express recalled her as "the most sought-after Hindi film actress" of her times, while Filmfare characterized her as "a Cinderella whose clock had struck twelve too soon". A number of her co-workers including Premnath (who wrote a poem dedicated to her), B. K. Karanjia and Shakti Samanta expressed their grief over her premature death. Gossip columnist Gulshan Ewing commented in a personal farewell titled "The Passing of Anarkali", writing, "She loved life, she loved the world and she was often shocked to find that the world did not always love her back. [...] To her, all life was love, all love was life. That was Madhubalaloveliest of the shining stars."

In 2010, Madhubala's tomb along with those of other industry stalwarts was demolished to make way for newer graves. Her remains were placed at an unknown location.

Public image
Madhubala was one of the most celebrated film stars in India from the late 1940s to early 1960s. In 1951, James Burke photographed her for a feature in the American magazine Life, which described her as the biggest star in the Indian film industry at that time. Her fame reached beyond India as well: director Frank Capra offered her a break in Hollywood (which her father declined) and in August 1952, David Cort of Theatre Arts Magazine wrote of her as "the biggest star in the worldand she's not in the Beverley Hills." Cort estimated Madhubala's Indian and Pakistani fan base equal to the combined population of the contemporary United States and western Europe, and also reported her popularity in countries such as Myanmar, Indonesia, Malaysia and East Africa. Along with Nargis, she also had large fan following in Greece.

Dilip Kumar described Madhubala as "the only star for whom people thronged outside the gates." Her fame was acknowledged by Time magazine also, which went on to call her a "cash and curry star" in its January 1959 issue. In films, she was often billed before the leading man, and web portal Rediff.com mentioned her as a more powerful celebrity than her male contemporaries. For Mahal (1949), her first film under a major production company, Madhubala was paid a sum of 7 thousands. The film's success established her career as a leading lady, and she subsequently became one of the highest-paid Indian stars of the upcoming decade. In 1951, filmmaker and editor Aurbindo Mukhopadhyay reported that Madhubala charges 1.5 lakh per film. She received an unprecedented amount of 3 lakh for her decade-long work in Mughal-e-Azam (1960). Madhubala was placed seven times on Box Office India's list of top actresses from 1949 to 1951, and from 1958 to 1961.

Madhubala's beauty and physical attractiveness were widely acknowledged, and led the media to refer to her as "The Venus of Indian cinema" and "The Beauty with Tragedy". In 1951, Clare Mendonca of The Illustrated Weekly of India called her "the number one beauty of the Indian screen". Several of her co-workers cited her as the most beautiful woman they ever saw. Nirupa Roy said that "there never was and never will be anyone with her looks" while Nimmi (co-star in the 1954 film Amar) admitted passing a sleepless night after her first meeting with Madhubala. In 2011, Shammi Kapoor confessed to falling in love with her during the shoot of the 1953 film Rail Ka Dibba: "Even today ... I can swear that I have never seen a more beautiful woman. Add to that her sharp intellect, maturity, poise and sensitivity ... When I think of her even now, after six decades, my heart misses a beat. My God, what beauty, what presence." Due to her perceived appeal, Madhubala became one of the brand ambassadors of beauty products by Lux and Godrej. However, she stated that happiness matters more to her than physical beauty.

From the beginning of her career, Madhubala gained a reputation for avoiding parties and refusing interviews, leading her to be labeled recluse and arrogant. On an unusual instance in 1958, her father even wrote an apology letter to then-Prime Minister of India, Jawaharlal Nehru, for disallowing Madhubala to attend Nehru's private function where she was invited. Having been a part of the film industry since childhood, Madhubala saw the social scene as superficial and expressed her despise of "the kind of functions where only the current favourites are invited and where a decade or two hence I would not be invited." In a two decade-long career, Madhubala was seen at the premieres of only two filmsBahut Din Huwe (1954) and Insaniyat (1955)both for personal reasons. Her regular photographer, Ram Aurangbadakar complained that she "lacked warmth" and "was very detached", which is also reflected in Ashokamitran's statement describing her as an inarticulate and pitiful person. Gulshan Ewing, one of Madhubala's closest associates, however, differed and stated that her friend "was none of these." Nadira added that Madhubala "had not a strain of pettiness, of anything small. That girl did not know anything about hate," and Dev Anand recalled her as a "self-assured [and] cultured [person], very independent in her thinking and particular about her way of life and her position in the film industry."

Madhubala's refusal to grant interviews or to interact with the press drew in extreme reactions from its members. By early 1950, Khan had begun asserting in her film contracts that no journalists would be allowed to meet her without his permission. When shortly after Madhubala declined to entertain a set of visiting journalists on set, they started vilifying her and her family and further placed a bounty to behead and kill her. For self-protection, Madhubala was given the permission to carry a revolver and move around under armed protection by the state government, until Khan and other journalists ultimately made a settlement. Her relationship with the press remained bitter, nevertheless, and she was regularly pointed out by it for her religious beliefs and perceived arrogance. Another major controversy she faced during her career was the Naya Daur civil war fought against B. R. Chopra, which Bunny Reuben mentions in his memoir as "the most sensational court case ever to be fought in the annals of Indian cinema."

Regardless of all these dissensions, Madhubala was known in the media as a disciplined and professional performer, with Kidar Sharma (director of the 1947 film Neel Kamal) recalling her early days in the industry, "She worked like a machine, missed a meal, travelled daily in the over-crowded third-class compartments from Malad to Dadar and was never late or absent from work." Anand said in a 1958 interview, "When Madhubala is on the set, one often goes much ahead in the schedule." Except for the filming of Gateway of India (1957) and Mughal-e-Azam (1960), Khan never allowed Madhubala to work in nights. Despite medical precautions, she performed even exhausting scenes by herself, such as doing complicated dances, wearing iron chains twice of her body weight and getting wet in water.

Artistry and legacy

Acting style and reception
In a 22-year-long career, Madhubala acted in almost every film genre, ranging from romantic musicals to slapstick comedies, and crime thrillers to historical dramas. The author of Celebrities: A Comprehensive Biographical Thesaurus of Important Men and Women in India (1952), Jagdish Bhatia noted that Madhubala turned her disadvantages into advantage and despite her non-filmy background "rose to be one of the most talented female stars of the industry." Baburao Patel, writing for Filmindia, called her "easily our most talented, most versatile and best-looking artiste." A number of her directors including Sharma, Shakti Samanta and Raj Khosla spoke highly of her acting talents on different occasions. Ashok Kumar described her as the finest actress he ever worked with, while Dilip Kumar wrote in his autobiography that she was "a vivacious artiste ... so instantaneous in her responses that the scenes became riveting even when they were being filmed ... she was an artiste who could keep pace and meet the level of involvement demanded by the script."

Writing retrospectively for The New York Times, Aisha Khan characterised Madhubala's acting style as "natural" and "understated", noting that she often portrayed roles of "modern young women testing the limits of traditions". Film critic Sukanya Verma felt that actresses like Madhubala "should be applauded for doing more than just looking good and crying buckets." Madhubala was acknowledged in the media for her unconventional roles, such as a flirtatious cabaret dancer in Howrah Bridge (1958)which led Filmfare to compare her with Rita Hayworth and Ava Gardnera rebellious and independent woman in Chalti Ka Naam Gaadi (1958), and a fearless court dancer in Mughal-e-Azam (1960). Her roles in Amar (1954), Gateway of India (1957), and Barsaat Ki Raat (1960) have also been noted by modern-day critics for being offbeat and significantly different from the usual portrayals of female characters in Indian cinema. Madhubala has also been credited for introducing several modern styles, such as trousers (for females) and strapless dresses in Bollywood. Her distinctive wavy hairstyle was referred to as "the out-of-the-bed look" and further established her screen persona as a liberated and independent woman. David Cort summarized her as "the ideal of the free Indian woman or what India hopes the free Indian woman will be."

Madhubala had the shortest career among her contemporaries, but by the time she quit acting, she had already successfully featured in over 70 films. Her screen time in leading roles was always equal to her male co-starswhich has otherwise been a rarityand she has also been credited for being one of the earliest personalities who, in the era of mass communication, took the position of Indian cinema to global standards. Moreover, with Bahut Din Huwe (1954), Madhubala became the first Hindi actress to have a career in south Indian cinema. Jerry Pinto has cited Madhubala as one of the earliest Bollywood actresses who created a distinct sex symbol by "merg[ing]" "the vamp and the virgin", and publications including Rediff.com and Hindustan Times mentioned her among the topmost sex symbols of Bollywood. A 2011 poll conducted by Rediff.com saw Madhubala receiving the third highest number of votes among "the hottest women who've ever scorched our screens"; the portal's writer commented, "In the end, I guess, it's about beauty. And there weren't many who could match up to the ethereal Madhubala."

Although Madhubala appeared in almost all film genres during her career, her most notable films included comedies. She gained recognition for her comic timing after her performance in Mr. & Mrs. '55 (1955), which Iqbal Masud of India Today call "a marvellous piece of sexy-comic acting." However, despite her success and fame, she neither received any acting award nor critical acclaim. Several critics have stated that her perceived beauty was an impediment to her craft to be taken seriously. Madhubala wished to play more dramatic and author-backed roles, but was often discouraged. According to Dilip Kumar, audience "missed out on a lot of her other attributes." Biographer Sushila Kumari said that "people were so mesmerised by her beauty that they never cared for the actress", and Shammi Kapoor thought of her as "a highly underrated actress in spite of performing consistently well in her films."

Madhubala's talents were first acknowledged after the release of Mughal-e-Azam (1960), but it turned out to be one of her final films. Her dramatic portrayal of Anarkaliranked amongst Bollywood's finest female performances by Upperstall.com and by Filmfare in generalestablished her as an enduring figure in Indian cinema. One of the romantic scenes from the film, in which Dilip Kumar brushes Madhubala's face with a plume, was declared the most erotic scene in Bollywood's history by Outlook in 2008, and by Hindustan Times in 2011. Her critical reception improved in the 21st century, with Khatija Akbar noting that Madhubala's "brand of acting had an underplayed and spontaneous quality. Anyone looking for heavy histrionics and laboured 'acting' missed the point". In 1999, M. L. Dhawan of The Tribune stated that Madhubala "could communicate more with her delicately raised eyebrows than most performers could with a raised voice" and "knew the knack of conveying her character's inner-most feelings." Priya Ramani of Mint added: "You only had to slip her into a wet sari, ask her to lean invitingly into the camera or hand her co-star a feather, and you could comfortably forecast that the cinematic sigh would resonate for at least a hundred years."

In recent years, Madhubala's legacy has maintained fans of all different ages, both younger and older. She is recognized even by those who are unfamiliar with vintage cinema and has dozens of fan sites dedicated to her on the social media. Modern magazines continue to publish stories on her personal life and career, often promoting her name heavily on the covers to attract sales. Her legacy has extended to fashion also: she has been acknowledged as the creator of many iconic fashion styles, such as wavy hairstyle and strapless dresses, which are widely followed by many celebrities. In accordance with her enduring popularity, News 18 wrote, "the cult of Madhubala is a difficult thing to match up to." Several modern-day celebrities, including Aamir Khan, Hrithik Roshan, Shah Rukh Khan, Madhuri Dixit, Rishi Kapoor and Naseeruddin Shah rank Madhubala among their favorite artistes of Indian cinema. Research analyst Rohit Sharma has studied narratives about Madhubala and surmised the reason behind her continued relevancy among new generation: 

On the occasion of her eighty-fifth birthday, Nivedita Mishra of Hindustan Times described Madhubala as "by far, the most iconic silver screen goddess India has produced." In the decades following her death, she has emerged as one of the most celebrated personalities in the Indian cinematic field, and her reputation has endured. Also in polls and surveys, she is described as one of India's finest and most beautiful actresses of all-time. Khatija Akbar, Mohan Deep and Sushila Kumari have also written books about her.

Tributes and honours
 Mandoubala, a Greek song dedicated to Madhubala, was performed at the closing ceremony of the 2004 Athens Olympics 
 Digitally-colorized versions of two of Madhubala's filmsMughal-e-Azam (in 2004) and Half Ticket (in 2012)have been released theatrically. 
 
 In March 2008, Indian Post issued a commemorative postage stamp featuring Madhubala, that was launched by her surviving family members and co-stars; the only other Indian actress that was honoured in this manner was Nargis, at that point of time. 
 In 2010, Filmfare included Madhubala's performance as Anarkali in Mughal-e-Azam in its list of Bollywood's "80 Iconic Performances". 
 Her introduction scene in Mughal-e-Azam was included by Sukanya Verma in Rediff.com's list of "20 scenes that took our breath away". The film itself has been considered one of the greatest films ever made in polls by British Film Institute and News18. 
 In August 2017, the New Delhi center of Madame Tussauds unveiled a statue of Madhubala inspired by her look in the film as a tribute to her. 
 In 2018, The New York Times published a belated obituary for Madhubala, comparing her life to that of Marilyn Monroe. 
 On 14 February 2019, her 86th birth anniversary, search engine Google commemorated her with a doodle; Google commented: "While her breathtaking appearance earned comparisons to Venus, Madhubala was a gifted actor with an understated style well suited for comedies, dramas, and romantic roles alike. [...] Appearing in over 70 films over the course of a tragically brief career, Madhubalawho would have turned 86 todaywas called "The Biggest Star in the World" in 1952 by Theatre Arts Magazine."

In film
Madhubala has served as the inspiration behind the characters of actresses Soha Ali Khan, Kangana Ranaut and Deepika Padukone in Khoya Khoya Chand (2007), Once Upon a Time in Mumbaai (2010), and Bajirao Mastani (2015), respectively.

In July 2018, Madhubala's sister Madhur Bhushan, announced that she was planning to make a biopic on her sister. Bhushan wants Kareena Kapoor to play Madhubala, but as of 2018, the project remains in its initial stages. In November 2019, filmmaker Imtiaz Ali was considering a biopic of Madhubala, but later dropped the idea after her family denied permission. Actresses including Kriti Sanon, Kangana Ranaut, Kiara Advani, and Janhvi Kapoor, and Yami Gautam have expressed their wish to play Madhubala in a biopic.

Popular culture references
The 1950 film Madhubala was named after the actress as a tribute to her stardom.
In the 1958 film Chalti Ka Naam Gaadi, Manmohan (Kishore Kumar), on seeing Renu (Madhubala) in his garage, excitedly says, "Hum samjha koi bhoot-woot hoga" ("Oh I thought it was a ghost"). The dialogue was a reference to Madhubala's portrayal of a ghostly woman in Mahal (1949).
Actress Nishi parodied Madhubala in the 1960 film Parakh.
In the 1970s, Greek singer Stelios Kazantzidis produced the song "Mandoubala" as a tribute to Madhubala.
In the 1990 film Jeevan Ek Sanghursh, the characters of Madhuri Dixit and Anil Kapoor imitated a dance sequence featuring Madhubala and Kishore Kumar from Chalti Ka Naam Gaadi (1958).
Madhuri Dixit parodied Madhubala in the 1990 film Kishen Kanhaiya.
In the opening credits of the 1995 film Rangeela, a tribute to the Hindi film industry, each name is accompanied with an image of a vintage film star, including Madhubala, Dev Anand and Amitabh Bachchan.
Madhubala's Anarkali look has inspired Madhuri Dixit in Lajja (2001) and Mallika Sherawat in Maan Gaye Mughal-e-Azam (2008).
Priyanka Chopra parodied Madhubala, Meena Kumari and Nargis in the 2007 film Salaam-e-Ishq.
In 2017, actress Mouni Roy dressed herself as Madhubala's Anarkali for a dance performance.

Works and accolades

Madhubala appeared in 72 films between 1942 and 1964, including Basant (1942), Neel Kamal (1947), Mahal (1949), Badal (1951), Tarana (1951), Amar (1954), Mr. & Mrs. '55 (1955), Kala Pani (1958), Howrah Bridge (1958), Chalti Ka Naam Gaadi (1958), Mughal-e-Azam (1960), Barsaat Ki Raat (1960), Half Ticket (1962) and Sharabi (1964). Her seventy-third and last film was the posthumously released Jwala (1971). She was credited as a producer in Naata (1955), Mehlon Ke Khwab (1960) and Pathan (1962). For her work in Mughal-e-Azam, Madhubala was nominated for Filmfare Award for Best Actress; it was the only nomination she ever received.

Footnotes

Bibliography

References

Further reading

External links

 

1933 births
1969 deaths
Indian film actresses
Actresses in Hindi cinema
Actresses from Delhi
Pashtun women
Indian people of Pashtun descent
20th-century Indian actresses
People with congenital heart defects